Homelix annuligera is a species of beetle in the family Cerambycidae. It was described by Per Olof Christopher Aurivillius in 1914, originally misspelled as "Homelix annuliger". It is known from Malawi.

References

Phrynetini
Beetles described in 1914